Sagging may refer to:
 Sagging (fashion), a fashion trend for wearing pants below the waist to expose one's underwear
 Sagging (naval), the stress a ship is put under when it passes over the trough of a wave
 Ptosis (breasts), the relaxing of breast's structures due to aging